This is a list of wars and conflicts involving Jamaica.

List

References

 
Jamaica
Wars